Alan Cooper is an American religious scholar and former musician who was the provost of the Jewish Theological Seminary of America (JTS), an academic institution that teaches Jewish studies and one of the centers for Conservative Judaism. He is also the Elaine Ravich Professor of Jewish Studies at JTS.

Education 
Cooper graduated with a Bachelor of Arts degree from Columbia College in 1971 and went on to do his graduate work at Yale University, where he obtained a Master of Philosophy and PhD in religious studies.

Career 
Cooper was formerly a singer in the band Sha Na Na, formed by his Columbia classmates, and sang the lead in "At the Hop" in Woodstock. He also made appearances on The Tonight Show and The Merv Griffin Show.

Cooper served on the faculties of McMaster University and Hebrew Union College – Jewish Institute of Religion. In 1997, he was appointed to a position at the Jewish Theological Seminary of America. In 1998, he was appointed Professor of Bible at the Union Theological Seminary in New York, becoming the first person to hold a joint professorship at both Union and JTS.  His dual appointment has been described as a major step in strengthening ties between the two seminaries.

References

Living people
Jewish biblical scholars
American biblical scholars
American Conservative Jews
Jewish Theological Seminary of America faculty
Yale University alumni
Sha Na Na members
American rock singers
Union Theological Seminary (New York City) faculty
Year of birth missing (living people)
21st-century Jewish biblical scholars
Columbia College (New York) alumni